Omid Alishah (born January 10, 1992) is an Iranian professional footballer who plays as a winger for Persian Gulf Pro League club Persepolis.

He signed a two-year contract with Persepolis on 11 June 2013 and made his debut on 16 August 2013. On 23 November 2014, Alishah scored the winning goal in the Tehran derby against rival Esteghlal in the 78th minute. has also played for Nassaji Mazandaran, Naft Tehran, Rah Ahan and Tractor. Also, He was the 2015–16 PGL Top Goal Assistant.

Club career

Nassaji

Alishah started his career at Nassaji while he was 17. He debuted for the club on January 7, 2010, against Shirin Faraz when he was chosen as a starter by the coach Nader Dastneshan.

Naft Tehran

In 2010–11 season, Alishah joined newly promoted IPL team Naft Tehran. During his time at Naft, he failed to make any appearances for the first team. He was also a part of Naft Tehran U-21 and won the 2010–11 Tehran U–21 League.

Rah Ahan
After a season at Naft, Alishah was signed up by Ali Daei for Rah Ahan. Ali Daei moved him up the field and into a more attacking position using Alishah as a right winger/second striker instead of right back where he had been used by his previous managers. Alishah with his blistering pace quickly managed to find his way into the starting line-up scoring 5 goals in his first nine games. He had a less successful second half of a season mainly due to a Cruciate ligament injury in a match against Damash Gilan in March 2012. He had been far from the team till December 2012.

Persepolis

He signed a two-year contract with Persepolis on 11 June 2013. He made his debut on 16 August 2013 in a match against Malavan, in which he scored the winning goal. He scored his second goal on 6 April 2014 in a 2–2 draw against his former team, Rah Ahan. On 23 November 2014, Alishah scored the winning goal in the Tehran derby against rival Esteghlal in the 78th minute. He was sent off after receiving his second yellow card seconds after his goal.

In 2015, before the 2015–16 season, Alishah was designated as the Persepolis' third captain. Also, he was the 2015–16 PGL Top Goal Assistant.

From the 2022 season, he became the team first captain.

Tractor 
In the winter of 2017, Alishah signed a two–year contract with Tractor to spend his conscription period at the club. Alishah returned to Persepolis before 2018-19 league.

International career

U–17
Alishah represented Iran U-17 in the 3 of the 4 games the team played at the 2009 FIFA U-17 World Cup.

U–20
He also made the squad for the unsuccessful 2010 AFC U-19 Championship. Surprisingly, his involvement was highly limited under the guidance of his former U17 manager, Ali Doustimehr.

U-22
He was invited to Iran U-22 by the coach Alireza Mansourian. He made his debut against Qatar U-22 and scored his first goal at the match.

Senior

He made his debut against Guam on 3 September 2015 in the 2018 FIFA World Cup qualifying.

Style of play 

Alishah has been a goal maker for the team with his high speed and scoring power. He has been considered to be highly capable in all attacking positions.

Personal life 
As a child, he experienced athletics, handball, futsal, and football. His first professional football experience was related to Iran's under-11 national football team.

Club career statistics

 Assists

International goals

Under-20

Under-22

Honours

Club 
Persepolis
Persian Gulf Pro League (4): 2016–17, 2018–19, 2019–20, 2020–21 ; Runner-up (2): 2013–14 , 2015–16
Hazfi Cup (1): 2018–19 ; Runner-up (1): 2016–17
Iranian Super Cup (3): 2018, 2019, 2020 ; Runner-up (1): 2021
AFC Champions League Runner-up (2): 2018, 2020

Individual 
Persian Gulf Pro League team of the year (1): 2015–16
Persian Gulf Pro League top assistant (1): 2015–16

References

External links

Omid Alishah at PersianLeague.com
Omid Alishah at ffiri.ir

1992 births
People from Sari, Iran
Living people
Nassaji Mazandaran players
Naft Tehran F.C. players
Rah Ahan players
Persepolis F.C. players
Tractor S.C. players
Iranian footballers
Iran under-20 international footballers
Association football wingers
Sportspeople from Sari, Iran
Iran international footballers
Persian Gulf Pro League players